Sarah Jane Wolfe (March 21, 1875 – March 29, 1958) was an American silent film character actress who is considered an important female figure in magick. She was a friend and a colleague of Aleister Crowley and a founding member of Agape Lodge of the Ordo Templi Orientis in Southern California.

Early life
Wolfe was born in the tiny Pennsylvania borough of St. Petersburg in Clarion County. She came from Pennsylvania Dutch stock. Her name at birth was Sarah Jane Wolfe but when she later went on the stage, she adopted the single name of Jane. She was the middle child, her older brother John was born in the previous year and her sister, Mary K., was born a year and a day later, the same year that their father died. John spent many years in Montana but Wolfe and Mary K. were closely associated through much of their lives.

Wolfe loved her grandfather Bill and snuggled him whenever she could. He was a very busy man as he raised nearly all the family. Her grandmother worked hard in the kitchen and turned out delicious Pennsylvania Dutch treats for the family.

When Wolfe was eight years old the family lived at McKnightstown, only four miles from their grandfather's farm which Wolfe used to visit to spend time with grandfather Bill, cuddling him, as he grew weaker in old age.

At age of 19, Wolfe attended Eastman Business College in Poughkeepsie to prepare for stenographic work and met her first flame, a Spaniard from Puerto Rico.

Acting
As a young girl, Wolfe went to New York City to pursue a career in the theatre but soon became involved with acting in the fledgling motion picture industry. She made her film debut in 1910 at the age of 35 with Kalem Studios in A Lad from Old Ireland under the direction of Sidney Olcott.

In 1911, Wolfe was part of the Kalem Company's crew in New York City who relocated to the company's new production facilities in Hollywood. She was active in early silent movies, as she had distinctive features. She was an excellent actress and rarely lacked work.

Wolfe went on to become one of the leading character actors of the decade, appearing in more than one hundred films including an important secondary role in the 1917 film Rebecca of Sunnybrook Farm.

Hollywood and magick
In the Fall 1913, when Wolfe worked in Hollywood, the book Magic, Black and White was given to her to read and after this she dipped into various magazines and books of an occult nature.

Ouija
Wolfe used the Ouija board beginning in 1917, when it first came to her attention. She credited some of her greatest spiritual communications to the use of this implement.

In August 1917, when using the ouija board, Wolfe established contact with a spirit who called himself "Bab", and another called "Gan", a Chinese, who gave her definite messages and then departed. After this, spirits who represented themselves as the first two came and gave messages, calling her "the chosen".

Automatic writing
In 1917, Wolfe met a person named L. V. Jefferson, who did a lot of automatic writing and was a psychic. A disembodied spirit named Fee Wah used his hand. Jefferson told Wolfe he would be glad to take her as a student. Early in 1918, she tried her own automatic writing.

Thelema
In October 1918, Wolfe ordered The Equinox, Vol. I, No. 1 and Book 4. She then tried Pranayama for some time, and had a yoga teacher for about three weeks but found this unsatisfactory.

In early 1919, Wolfe began writing to Aleister Crowley.

Until about 1920, Wolfe co-starred in more than 90 films, after which her acting career ended following her move to Cefalù where she resided with  Crowley, studying Thelema and magick. Wolfe often expressed her wish to direct a film about magic and Thelema in subsequent years.

A∴A∴

Cefalu
In 1918, at the age of 43, Jane Wolfe began corresponding with Aleister Crowley, and two years later she gave up her career in Hollywood to join Crowley at his Abbey of Thelema at Cefalù, Sicily, living there from 1920 until it closed in 1923. In Cefalu Wolfe was admitted to the A∴A∴ by Crowley, taking the magickal name Soror Estai. She undertook various practises including yoga, dharana, and pranayama of which she kept a detailed record which was later published by the College of Thelema of Northern California  as The Cefalu Diaries. It was the custom at the Abbey of Thelema in Cefalu, where Wolfe came to stay, to allow Aspirants three days as a guest as an aid in general orientation. After that, they were required to work on their attainment or leave. Wolfe had come there to receive some training in yoga and in magick and to discover her True Will. This purpose pulled her through all of the shattering happenings. Wolfe discovered the little town of Cefalu which was only about half a mile from the "Villa Santa Barbara" which had become The Abbey of Thelema. It was on a slope of the mountains lying South of Cefalu and was situated in an olive grove. The path to the town offered endless variety as it wound down among rocks and trees. The Abbey residents spent many hours climbing it for exercise and meditation, observing its overall shape, lofty peak high in the sky and its large base. Crowley was especially fond of the South face of this outcropping and liked its steep and gently sloping sides. During her stay at Cefalu, Wolfe often went mountain climbing with Crowley who taught it. On December 4, 1921, Crowley gave Wolfe a certain talisman which had a seal of spirit Marbas engraved on it. Wolfe's task was to meditate upon it.

In her diaries of that period, she records that after a few attempts she made a contact with the spirit of the talisman and spoke to him often. Her daily routine consisted of performance of Liber Resh which was said four times a day, with all occupants of the Abbey participating unless they were ill. The Abbey occupants were aroused at 6 am every morning by the beating of the tom-tom. For a while, Wolfe found this very difficult as it seemed a shock to the system. The work she had been assigned usually took until after 10 pm, so she had only 6 hours of sleep. Her body demanded more than this, and many times she had to succumb or have a nap during the day. After waking up, Wolfe spent 20 minutes or so in her Asana and after that, she imagined the yellow square of the tattwas for another 20 minutes, with varying results. Following that came visualisation exercises and then breakfast. This same regimen was repeated after dinner about 7.30 pm, starting around 10 pm of the evening. The after-dinner discussions with Crowley sometimes aided Wolfe in understanding of the tasks of her degree. During her magical retirement on the beach near Cefalu which lasted for a month, Wolfe started Asana-meditation at 30 minutes each, the first week, increasing it to two hours during the last week. During the last week of her retreat, Wolfe added a number of new asanas to her yoga practise which she performed daily in the nude on the beach. Her other exercises consisted of going from the tent into the ocean for swims in order to relax. Wolfe worked with Crowley's Thelemic system of training in Cefalu for three years, and emerged from those years with a degree of attainment, having survived Crowley's ordeals. She later worked as Crowley's personal representative in London and Paris.

Southern California
Upon her return to Los Angeles Wolfe helped to found the Agape Lodge in California. On June 6, 1940, Wolfe took Phyllis Seckler as her student, making her a Probationer of the A∴A∴, which later started up the Soror Estai A∴A∴ lineage/bloodline.

Ordo Templi Orientis
Wolfe is considered an important female figure in magick as, in addition to her friendship and work with Crowley, she took part in the founding of the Agape Lodge of the Ordo Templi Orientis in Southern California as well as being its lodge master.

Later years
After not appearing on screen for 17 years, in 1937 Jane Wolfe had a small role in a B-movie titled Under Strange Flags. Starting in May 1937 Wolfe taught Dramatics and Speech Development on the evening theatrical course in Pasadena. From 1938 Wolfe served as a chairman of the Cultural Arts Program of Los Feliz Women's Club, chairman of the Drama Section of the same club, and a chairman of the Observers' Club.

Death
Wolfe died on March 29, 1958, in the Southern California city of Glendale eight days after her 83rd birthday.

Partial filmography

A Lad from Old Ireland (1910)
The Roses Of A Virgin (1910)
The Boer War (1914)
The Wild Goose Chase (1915)
The Majesty of the Law (1915)
The Case of Becky (1915)
Blackbirds (1915)
The Immigrant (1915)
Pudd'nhead Wilson (1916)
The Blacklist (1916)
The Thousand-Dollar Husband (1916)
The Selfish Woman (1916)
Each Pearl a Tear (1916)
The Lash (1916)
Unprotected (1916)
The Plow Girl (1916)
On Record (1917)
Castles for Two (1917)
Unconquered (1917)
The Crystal Gazer (1917)
On the Level (1917)
Rebecca of Sunnybrook Farm (1917)
The Call of the East (1917)
The Fair Barbarian (1917)
A Petticoat Pilot (1918)
Mile-a-Minute Kendall (1918)
The Bravest Way (1918)
The Firefly of France (1918)
Less Than Kin (1918)
The Cruise of the Make-Believes (1918)
The Girl Who Came Back (1918)
Under the Top (1919)
The Poor Boob (1919)
The Woman Next Door (1919)
An Innocent Adventuress (1919)
Men, Women, and Money (1919)
A Very Good Young Man (1919)
The Grim Game (1919)
The Thirteenth Commandment (1920)
The Six Best Cellars (1920)
Why Change Your Wife? (1920)
Thou Art the Man (1920)
The Round-Up (1920)
Behold My Wife! (1920)
Under Strange Flags (1937)

References

Bibliography

External links

1875 births
1958 deaths
People from Clarion County, Pennsylvania
Pennsylvania Dutch people
American occultists
American film actresses
American silent film actresses
American Thelemites
Members of Ordo Templi Orientis
Actresses from Pennsylvania
20th-century American actresses